"Flaming Youth" is a song by the American rock band Kiss. The song is featured on their 1976 album Destroyer, and was the first Kiss single to feature a picture sleeve.  The single reached number 74 in the U.S. and 73 in Canada.  Although the full album version only ran 2:55 (2:59 on CD remasters), the song was still edited to 2:39 with an earlier fade.

Overview
The song was written by Ace Frehley, Paul Stanley, Gene Simmons and Bob Ezrin. Ezrin took pieces of music written by the other three and organized them into one song. For example, one of the main riffs on "Flaming Youth" was from a song that Simmons wrote called "Mad Dog", which appeared on Kiss' 2001 release, The Box Set. This is not to be confused with a 1929 Duke Ellington song.

The song's instrumentation features a calliope, the use of which was inspired by producer Bob Ezrin.

Cash Box said that "the instruments really scream, particularly the guitars" and that "there's a lot of energy here." Record World called it "a raving anthem about growing up" and "a great follow to 'Shout It Out Loud.'".

In the United States, this was the first Kiss 45rpm 7 inch single to be produced with the tan "Casbah" label. However, it can be found from Canada and Japan with the dark blue "smoking man" label.

KISS - The Casablanca Singles 1974-1982 box set included the "Flaming Youth" 45rpm 7 inch single from the United States, however, it was pressed onto the dark blue "smoking man" label. The re-recorded/remastered version of the song from Destroyer- Resurrected (2012) was also used in the making of the record instead of the original 1976 version.

Personnel
Paul Stanley - lead vocals/rhythm guitar
Ace Frehley - lead guitar
Gene Simmons - bass guitar/backing vocals
Peter Criss - drums
Dick Wagner- guitar solo
Bob Ezrin - calliope

Chart performance

References

External links

Kiss (band) songs
1976 singles
Songs written by Paul Stanley
Songs written by Gene Simmons
Songs written by Ace Frehley
Songs written by Bob Ezrin
Casablanca Records singles
Song recordings produced by Bob Ezrin